Welton was a rural district in Lincolnshire, Parts of Lindsey from 1894 to 1974. It was formed under the Local Government Act 1894 from that part of the Lincoln rural sanitary district which was in Lindsey – the Kesteven part forming the Branston Rural District. It was named after Welton.

The district was abolished under the Local Government Act 1972, becoming part of the West Lindsey district of Lincolnshire.

List of parishes in Welton Rural District

References
Welton RD Parts of Lindsey through time – Administrative history of Local Government District: hierarchies, boundaries

Rural districts of Lindsey
Districts of England created by the Local Government Act 1894
Districts of England abolished by the Local Government Act 1972